Felipe Fernandez de Pardo, O.P. (February 1611 – December 31, 1689) was a Roman Catholic prelate who served as Archbishop of Manila (1680–1689).

Biography
Felipe Fernandez de Pardo was born in Valladolid, Spain and was ordained a priest in the Order of Preachers. He served as Rector Magnificus of the University of Santo Tomas for two consecutive terms from 1652 to 1656. On January 8, 1680, Pope Innocent XI appointed him Archbishop of Manila. On October 28, 1681, he was consecrated bishop by Diego de Aguilar, Bishop of Cebu with Ginés Barrientos, Auxiliary Bishop of Manila, serving as co-consecrator and assisted by Father Andrés González. He served as Archbishop of Manila until his death on December 31, 1689.

While bishop, he was the Principal Consecrator of Andrés González, Bishop of Nueva Caceres (1686).

References

External links and additional sources
 (for Chronology of Bishops) 
 (for Chronology of Bishops) 

1611 births
1689 deaths
Bishops appointed by Pope Innocent XI
Dominican bishops
Rector Magnificus of the University of Santo Tomas